Andrew Stephen Lock  (born November 10, 1996) is an American football quarterback for the Seattle Seahawks of the National Football League (NFL). He played college football at Missouri and was drafted by the Denver Broncos in the second round of the 2019 NFL Draft.

High school career
Lock attended Lee's Summit High School in Lee's Summit, Missouri. As a junior, he passed for 3,060 yards and 35 touchdowns. As a senior in 2014, he was the Kansas City Star's All-Metro Player of the Year after passing for 2,731 yards and 28 touchdowns. Lock was rated by Rivals as a four-star recruit and was ranked as the sixth-best pro-style quarterback in the 2015 class. He committed to the University of Missouri to play college football. He was considered a two-star basketball prospect as a shooting guard, but he retired from basketball after high school.

Collegiate career
Lock began his collegiate career by going 6-for-10 for 138 yards and a touchdown in the 2015 season-opener against Southeast Missouri State while coming off the bench for two series. He took over as Mizzou's starting quarterback over the final eight games of 2015. In a win over South Carolina, he became the school's first true freshman to start at quarterback since Corby Jones in 1995, going 21-for-28 for 136 yards and a pair of touchdowns. Against BYU at Arrowhead Stadium, Lock was 19-of-28 for a career-best 244 yards and a touchdown while also setting career highs in both passer rating and passing yards while posting his second-best completion percentage of the season. He finished the season 129-of-263 for 1,332 yards and four touchdowns.

Lock finished the 2016 regular season ranked first in the SEC in passing yards (3,399) and second in passing yards per game (283.3) and yards per completion (14.34) while posting top-20 marks nationally in all three categories as well, peaking at 10th nationally with his 3,399 passing yards. Also, he ranked second in the SEC in completions per game (19.75) and third in total offense (293.5). His 3,399 yards through the air are the fifth-most in program history in a single season and the most ever in a 12-game season at Mizzou, while his 23 passing touchdowns were the sixth-most in program history and only three Missouri quarterbacks have thrown for more in a single season. He completed 24-for-37 for a career-high 450 yards while tying a school record with five touchdowns against Eastern Michigan in Mizzou's home opener. He tossed for three more touchdowns on 23-of-38 passing in Missouri's 28–27 loss to Georgia. His passing total of 1,106 yards was more than any Mizzou quarterback in his first three games ever. He played only the first half against Delaware State, but put up huge numbers in the 79–0 win. In the first half alone, he completed 26 of 36 passes for 402 yards while matching the school record with five touchdowns. He closed his season by sparking a second-half 17-point comeback with a 67-yard TD pass to Johnathon Johnson against Arkansas. He finished that game going 16-for-26 with 268 yards and a score.

In the 2017 season, Lock led the NCAA (FBS) and set the SEC and Missouri record for passing touchdowns (44) while helping the Tigers reach a bowl game after starting the season 1–5. He finished the season with 242-of-419 passing (57.8%) for 3,964 yards with 44 touchdowns and 13 interceptions (165.7 rtg.). Lock was selected to the First-team All-SEC. He finished his college football career with a total of 108 (99 passing, 9 rushing) touchdowns.

Statistics

Professional career

Denver Broncos
Lock was selected by the Denver Broncos in the second round as the 42nd overall pick in the 2019 NFL Draft.

2019

Lock suffered a thumb injury in the preseason and was placed on injured reserve on September 1, 2019. He was designated for return from injured reserve on November 12, 2019, and resumed practicing with the team.

On November 30, 2019, the Broncos activated Lock off of injured reserve and named him the starter for their game the next day against the Los Angeles Chargers. He threw for 134 yards, two touchdowns, and one interception, and he moved the Broncos down the field in the last 15 seconds (via a pass interference penalty on the Chargers' Casey Heyward Jr.) to set up a Brandon McManus 53-yard field goal as time expired, leading the Broncos to a 23–20 win, his first NFL victory. 

During Week 14 against the Houston Texans, a game in which the Texans were favored by nine points, Lock threw three touchdowns in the first half and led another scoring drive to start the second half, giving his team a 38–3 lead. The Broncos eventually won the game 38–24, and Lock finished with 309 passing yards, three touchdowns, and an interception. He ended up starting the remainder of the season. 

In five games, he finished with 1,020 passing yards, seven touchdowns, and three interceptions. He went 4–1 as a starter in 2019 and in the process, tied with legendary Broncos quarterback John Elway for the most franchise wins by a rookie QB with four, only needing five games to accomplish the feat that Elway did not reach until his 10th game.

2020

In Week 1 against the Tennessee Titans on Monday Night Football, Lock threw for 216 yards and a touchdown during the 16–14 loss. In Week 2, he left the game early in the first quarter with a shoulder injury against the Pittsburgh Steelers. Without Lock the Broncos lost the game 26–21. 

Lock would return from his injury in the Broncos' Week 6 matchup against the New England Patriots. In the game, Lock had only 189 yards passing and two interceptions, but the Broncos won the game 18–12 thanks to six Brandon McManus field goals. With the win, Lock became the youngest quarterback ever to defeat the Patriots at Gillette Stadium under head coach Bill Belichick, as well as the second quarterback to do so while throwing multiple interceptions (Kurt Warner also accomplished the feat back in 2001). In Week 8 against the Los Angeles Chargers, he had 248 passing yards, three passing touchdowns, and one interception in the 31–30 comeback victory. The third touchdown pass was a game-winning one-yard pass to K. J. Hamler with no time remaining. In Week 9 against the Atlanta Falcons, Lock threw for 313 yards, two touchdowns, and an interception and rushed for 47 yards and another touchdown in the 34–27 loss. 

In Week 10 against the Las Vegas Raiders, Lock would have the worst passing performance of his career, throwing for 257 yards, one touchdown, and 4 interceptions during the 37–12 loss. On November 28, 2020, Lock was placed on the reserve/COVID-19 list after coming in close contact with Jeff Driskel, who tested positive for the virus. Lock and the other three quarterbacks on the Broncos roster were fined by the team for violating COVID-19 protocols. He was activated on December 1. In Week 14, against the Carolina Panthers, he had 280 passing yards and four passing touchdowns in the 32–27 victory. In Week 17 against the Las Vegas Raiders, Lock threw for 339 yards and 2 touchdowns during the 32–31 loss. 

Lock finished the 2020 season with 16 touchdowns and 15 interceptions, tied for the most interceptions in the NFL with Carson Wentz, despite only playing in 13 games. His completion percentage of 57.3% was the lowest among the 35 quarterbacks with at least 150 passing attempts in 2020.

2021

Lock spent the 2021 preseason in a competition with newly acquired quarterback Teddy Bridgewater. On August 25, Bridgewater was named the starter for week one ahead of Lock, after a close battle in the first and second preseason games. 

Lock played in Week 4 against the Baltimore Ravens after Bridgewater suffered a concussion. He completed 12 of 21 (57.1%) passes for a total of 113 yards and an interception, resulting in a 52.3 QB rating in the 23–7 loss. Lock entered the Week 12 game against the Los Angeles Chargers late in the first half after a leg injury temporarily sidelined Teddy Bridgewater. Lock completed 4 of 7 (57.1%) for a total of 26 yards and an interception, resulting in a QB rating of 25.6 in the 28–13 win. Bridgewater reentered and finished the game in the second half. Lock also came in the Broncos Week 15 matchup against the Cincinnati Bengals after Bridgewater left the game with a concussion. He completed 6 of 12 passes (50%) for 88 yards and a touchdown, and lost a fumble in the 15–10 loss. 

Lock was named the starter for the Broncos Week 16 matchup against the Las Vegas Raiders due to Bridgewater's injury. Lock threw for 153 yards, and no touchdowns or interceptions in the 17–13 loss. Lock would be the starter for the remainder of the season after Bridgewater was placed on injured reserve. Against the Kansas City Chiefs, Lock completed 12/24 passes (50%) for 162 yards, rushed for 35 yards, and rushed for two touchdowns becoming the first Broncos quarterback to rush for two touchdowns since Tim Tebow in 2011 in the 28–24 loss.

Seattle Seahawks
On March 16, 2022, Lock was traded to the Seattle Seahawks along with two first-round picks, two second-round picks, a fifth-round pick, defensive lineman Shelby Harris, and tight end Noah Fant in exchange for quarterback Russell Wilson. Upon arriving in Seattle, Lock changed his jersey number from #3, which he had worn in Denver and at Missouri, to #2, telling reporters he did so both out of respect for Wilson, who wore #3, and out of a desire to "write my own story." After competing with Geno Smith for three preseason games, Smith was named the starter, relegating Lock to a backup role for the regular season. He did not record any stats in 2022.

Lock re-signed with the Seahawks on March 16, 2023.

NFL career statistics

References

External links
 
 Seattle Seahawks bio
 Missouri Tigers bio

1996 births
Living people
American football quarterbacks
Denver Broncos players
Missouri Tigers football players
People from Lee's Summit, Missouri
Players of American football from Denver
Players of American football from Missouri
Seattle Seahawks players
Sportspeople from Columbia, Missouri
Sportspeople from the Kansas City metropolitan area